Nusplingen is a municipality of the Zollernalb district of Baden-Württemberg, Germany.

History
In 1803, Nusplingen became a possession of the Principality of Hohenzollern-Sigmaringen, who traded the town in 1813 to the Kingdom of Württemberg for Beuron Abbey. This district was itself dissolved in 1973, when , and Nusplingen was assigned to the newly-created Zollernalb district. After World War II, the town grew and industrialized beginning in the 1950s with development at its northern extremity.

Geography
The municipality (Gemeinde) of Nusplingen is located at the southern edge of the Zollernalb district of Baden-Württemberg, a state of the Federal Republic of Germany. It lies along the border with Tuttlingen district to the south and Sigmaringen to the east. Its primary watercourse is the Bära river, which flows through the municipality from north to south and whose valley dominates its landscape. Elevation above sea level in the municipal area ranges from a low of  Normalnull (NN) along the Bära to a high of  NN at the top of the Staufenberg.

Part of the Federally-protected  and  nature reserves are located in the municipality.

Coat of arms
Nusplingen's coat of arms shows an eagle's leg, with claws bared, in yellow upon a field of red. This pattern was taken from that of an extinct local noble family and was approved for official use by the provisional post-WWWII Württemberg-Hohenzollern government on 16 May 1950. Previous municipal emblems include a town seal from 1515 and a pattern of blue-black-yellow wavy bars devised in 1930. A municipal flag corresponding to the coat of arms was issued by the Baden-Württemberg State Ministry of the Interior on 30 August 1967.

Transportation
Nusplingen was selected to be the endpoint for the Heuberg Railway, but in 1928 Reichenbach was chosen over Nusplingen.

Citations

External links
  

Württemberg